DS5, DS-5, or DS 5 may refer to:

Automobiles

 Datsun DS-5, a Japanese 4-door sedan
 DS 5, a French compact station wagon
 DS 5LS, a French-Chinese sedan, separate model from DS 5

Music

 Deepspace5, an American underground hip hop supergroup

See also

 Canon EOS 5DS, a digital SLR camera